In mathematics, specifically algebraic topology, there is a distinguished class of spectra called Eilenberg–Maclane spectra  for any Abelian group pg 134. Note, this construction can be generalized to commutative rings  as well from its underlying Abelian group. These are an important class of spectra because they model ordinary integral cohomology and cohomology with coefficients in an abelian group. In addition, they are a lift of the homological structure in the derived category  of abelian groups in the homotopy category of spectra. In addition, these spectra can be used to construct resolutions of spectra, called Adams resolutions, which are used in the construction of the Adams spectral sequence.

Definition 
For a fixed abelian group  let  denote the set of Eilenberg–MacLane spaces with the adjunction map coming from the property of loop spaces of Eilenberg–Maclane spaces: namely, because there is a homotopy equivalencewe can construct maps  from the adjunction  giving the desired structure maps of the set to get a spectrum. This collection is called the Eilenberg–Maclane spectrum of pg 134.

Properties 
Using the Eilenberg–Maclane spectrum  we can define the notion of cohomology of a spectrum  and the homology of a spectrum pg 42. Using the functorwe can define cohomology simply asNote that for a CW complex , the cohomology of the suspension spectrum  recovers the cohomology of the original space . Note that we can define the dual notion of homology aswhich can be interpreted as a "dual" to the usual hom-tensor adjunction in spectra.

Mod-p spectra and the Steenrod algebra 
For the Eilenberg–Maclane spectrum  there is an isomorphismfor the p-Steenrod algebra .

Tools for computing Adams resolutions 
One of the quintessential tools for computing stable homotopy groups is the Adams spectral sequence. In order to make this construction, the use of Adams resolutions are employed. These depend on the following properties of Eilenberg–Maclane spectra. For the rest of the article  for some fixed abelian group

Equivalence of maps to K 

Constructing a surjection 
For a locally finite collection of elements in  generating it as an abelian group, the associated map  induces a surjection on cohomology, meaning if we evaluate these spectra on some topological space , there is always a surjectionof Abelian groups.

Steenrod-module structure on cohomology of spectra 
This is because the equivalence stated before can be read asand the map  induces the -structure.

See also 

 Adams spectral sequence
 Spectrum (topology)
 Homotopy groups of spheres

References

External links 

 Complex cobordism and stable homotopy groups of spheres
 The Adams Spectral Sequence

Algebraic topology
Homological algebra
Topology